Starparade  is a West German music television programme, which aired on ZDF from March 14, 1968, to June 5, 1980, and was hosted by Rainer Holbe, along with James Last and his orchestra who founded his world-wide success on the show.

History
Starparade was an elaborate music show which was filmed in different venues across Germany. Each show was broadcast for approximately 90 minutes and showcased music and short interviews with the artists. The inclusion of international acts, and acts more local to Germany, reflected the international reach of the programme that was sold to various broadcasters outside of Germany.  Initially, Starparade was scheduled for Saturday night, but was later moved to Thursday.  The series was initially due to be filmed in colour, but the first 13 episodes were transmitted in black and white. These black and white recordings, with the exception of the first episode, have been lost and are no longer in the ZDF archive.

Choice of music
Starparade, true to its name, featured popular, sometimes internationally famous acts, who would usually sing multiple songs. It featured domestic stars like Heino alongside international artists such as Johnny Cash, Boney M, Neil Diamond and ABBA. Alongside this, James Last's orchestra played instrumentals, at times even classical music. Every show also featured the official television ballet ensemble, which performed at least two dances, such that every show began with the opening music by Last's orchestra and a dance.

Episode 14 (30/9/1971) featured Max Greger and his orchestra.

Special edition
During the 1975 International Broadcasting Exhibition, a consumer electronics fair held annually in Berlin, digital technology made it possible to exhibit the show on a wall of TV screens, with each screen contributing a fraction to the complete picture.

Scottish Television
In 1979  Scottish Television  acquired the UK rights to the series. STV repackaged Star Parade, removing the German compere and adding new English continuity. Each episode was 60 minutes long. They were screened from 1979 to 1985 by each of the 15 ITV companies.

2013 re broadcasts

On 19 August 2013 ZDFKultur channel in Germany, started to re broadcast the Starparade series, and started with episode 14, featuring Max Greger instead of James Last

Episodes broadcast on ZDF

References

Online Archive of the Vienna Arbeiter-Zeitung and the Hamburger Abendblatt, closing the original programming

External links
 https://www.imdb.com/title/tt0476114/
 http://www.fernsehserien.de/starparade

German music television series
ZDF original programming
1968 German television series debuts
1960s German television series
1970s German television series
1980s British television series
1980 German television series endings
German-language television shows
Scottish television shows
Television series by STV Studios